Ramona is a Canadian children's television series which followed the life of eight-year-old title character Ramona Quimby (Sarah Polley). It was based on the Ramona book series by Beverly Cleary.

The series debuted on September 10, 1988, and its ten episodes spanned four months on CHCH in Canada. It was released on video by Lorimar Home Video. After that was acquired by Warner Communications, it continued on Warner Home Video.

Eight-year-old Ramona Quimby (Sarah Polley) feels that no one really understands her. She's bright, imaginative, and according to her older sister, Beezus, a "pest". Every day she tries to find out more about herself and her world, with an optimism that only children possess. The series follows Ramona's adventures in school and at home as her family struggles with financial woes and the coming of a new baby.

Cast
Sarah Polley as Ramona Quimby
Lynda Mason Green as Dorothy Day Quimby
Lori Chodos as Beatrice "Beezus" Quimby
Barry Flatman as Robert "Bob" Quimby
Bobby Becken as Howie Kemp
Kirsten Bishop as Beatrice "Bea" Day Kemp
Jayne Eastwood as Mrs. Whaley
Barclay Hope as Hobart Kemp
Helen Hughes as Mrs. Kemp
Nicole Lyn as Susan Kushner
Kerry Segal as Marsha
Marlow Vella as Danniel "Yard Ape"
Nerene Virgin as Mrs. Larson

Episode list

See also
 Ramona and Beezus
 Ramona Quimby
 Ramona series
 Beezus Quimby
 Mr. Robert Quimby
 Beverly Cleary—author of the Ramona series

References

External links
 

Television shows filmed in Hamilton, Ontario
1988 Canadian television series debuts
1989 Canadian television series endings
1980s Canadian children's television series
Canadian television shows based on children's books
Television series about children
Television series about families